Lelapia is a genus of sponges belonging to the family Lelapiidae.

The species of this genus are found in Australia.

Species:

Lelapia antiqua 
Lelapia australis 
Lelapia uteoides

References

Leucosolenida
Sponge genera